Cameo Hazlewood is an American-raised Guyanese footballer who plays as a forward for the Guyana women's national team.

Early life
Hazlewood was raised in Peoria, Illinois.

College career
Hazlewood has attended the Dunlap High School in Dunlap, Illinois and the University of Pennsylvania in Philadelphia.

International career
Hazlewood capped for Guyana at senior level during the 2018 CONCACAF Women's Championship qualification.

International goals
Scores and results list Guyana's goal tally first

See also
List of Guyana women's international footballers

References

External links

Living people
Guyanese women's footballers
Women's association football forwards
Guyana women's international footballers
Sportspeople from Peoria, Illinois
Soccer players from Illinois
American women's soccer players
Penn Quakers women's soccer players
African-American women's soccer players
American sportspeople of Guyanese descent
Year of birth missing (living people)